or  (or unofficially: Rombaksfjord) is a fjord that branches off of the main Ofotfjorden in Narvik Municipality in Nordland county, Norway. The European route E06 and European route E10 highways run along the northern shores of the fjord. The fjord has two bridge crossings: the Hålogaland Bridge, completed in 2018, crosses at mouth of the Rombaken fjord and the Rombak Bridge which crosses at a narrow point about mid-way down the fjord.

History
Along the inner part of the fjord there used to be a city——with 700 inhabitants. 
It had its time of greatness during the construction of the Ofotbanen, between 1898-1903.

World War II
Rombaken was the site of several naval battles during the Battle of Narvik in World War II.  Ten German destroyers, half the destroyer force of the Kriegsmarine, and one U-boat were sunk during the battle. It is also where ORP Grom, one of the two most heavily armed and fastest destroyers of World War II, was sunk by the a Heinkel He 11 from Luftwaffe's Kampfgeschwader 100.

After World War II
Parts of the bow of the German destroyer Georg Thiele remain visible above the water in Rombaksbotn to this day. The wrecks at Narvik remain popular diving spots, although some are off-limits because they still contain unexploded ordnance. Three of the German destroyers were lifted in 1964 and moved to Framnesodden, near Eidsvoid, to clear the shipping lane. A number of other wrecks are accessible, too, but most have been preserved as historic sites and it is forbidden to dive to them.

Media gallery

See also
Nygårds Hydroelectric Power Station

References

Fjords of Nordland
Narvik